Deborah Hannah Pontes Nunes, (born 14 March 1993 in Recife, Pernambuco) is a Brazilian handball player. She plays for the Russian club HC Astrakhanochka and is also member of the Brazil women's national handball team.

She has played in the 2012 Women's Junior World Handball Championship.

Titles
Pan American Women's Club Handball Championship:
2016

References

1993 births
Living people
Brazilian female handball players
Handball players at the 2010 Summer Youth Olympics
Sportspeople from Recife